Donald Ian Grainger Mills (28 August 1909 – 5 January 1945) was an Australian rules footballer who played with Hawthorn in the Victorian Football League (VFL).

Family
The son of Donald Albert Grainger Mills (181–1951), and Isabel Jane Mills (1885–1942), née Le Brun, Donald Ivas Grainger Mills was born at Saint Saviour, Jersey, in the Channel Islands on 28 August 1909.

He married Jean Mary Thomson (1915–2000) on 15 October 1940.

Death
He died in early 1945 when, with his brother-in-law, Mark Johns, he was aboard the shark-fishing vessel Moonbi that failed to return from a fishing trip from Port Franklin.

Notes

References

External links 

1909 births
1945 deaths
VFL/AFL players born outside Australia
Australian rules footballers from Victoria (Australia)
Hawthorn Football Club players
Boating accident deaths
Accidental deaths in Victoria (Australia)
Jersey sportspeople
People from Saint Saviour, Jersey